Marcus Stock (born 27 August 1961) is an English bishop of the Catholic Church who has been the tenth Bishop of Leeds  since 2014.

Early life
Marcus Nigel Ralph Stock was born on 27 August 1961 in London, England. He attended Oxford University, studying theology at Keble College. He entered training for the priesthood at the Venerable English College and was awarded a Licence in Dogmatic Theology by the Pontifical Gregorian University. He was ordained a Deacon whilst in Rome by Cardinal Basil Hume, the then Archbishop of Westminster.

Priestly ministry 
Marcus Stock was ordained a priest in 1988 by Maurice Couve de Murville, Archbishop of Birmingham, and served in parishes across the Archdiocese of Birmingham. Between 1991 and 1994, Stock was a teacher of Religious Education at the European School, Culham. He was appointed assistant director before being promoted to Director of the Archdiocesan Schools Commission between 1999 and 2009, before being appointed General Secretary of the Catholic Bishops' Conference of England and Wales in the same year by Vincent Nichols, Archbishop of Westminster. He led the Bishops' Conference during the Papal Visit to the UK in 2010 by Pope Benedict XVI and was in interim charge of the Catholic Education Service after the resignation of Oona Stannard. Shortly before his appointment as Bishop of Leeds it was announced that he would be succeeded at the Bishops' Conference by Christopher Thomas from the Diocese of Nottingham at the conclusion of his five-year term. In 2012, Marcus Stock was appointed Prelate of Honour by Pope Benedict XVI.

Episcopal career
Pope Francis appointed Stock to the See of Leeds on 15 September 2014. He chose the episcopal motto Desiderio, desideravi (Luke, 22:15) which translates as I have desired with desire to be with you or I have eagerly desired, referring to Jesus' fervent desire to celebrate the Passover with his disciples before his death. Stock attended Solemn Vespers on the eve of his consecration as bishop, where his episcopal insignia (ring, mitre and crozier) were blessed by John Wilson, the Diocesan Administrator (Vicar Capitular) for the Diocese of Leeds. His crozier was given as a gift from Stock's previous diocese, the Archdiocese of Birmingham.

On 13 November 2014, Stock was consecrated the tenth Bishop of Leeds by Vincent Cardinal Nichols, along with the co-consecrators Bernard Longley, Archbishop of Birmingham (from the diocese Stock had previously ministered in) and Archbishop Arthur Roche, Apostolic Administrator and Bishop emeritus of Leeds (whom Stock succeeded).

Stock issued a pastoral letter on 25 September 2016 on Sacramental Preparation for First Holy Communion and Confirmation and the Provision of Youth Services, changing the age at which the sacrament of Confirmation is generally conferred on young people from the age of 11 to 14, with consequential changes to the ages at which young people generally first receive the sacraments of reconciliation and holy communion.

References

External links

Right Reverend Marcus Nigel Stock, MA, STL, Tenth Bishop of Leeds Profile on Diocese of Leeds website

Living people
1961 births
21st-century Roman Catholic bishops in England
Roman Catholic clergy from London
Alumni of Keble College, Oxford
Pontifical Gregorian University alumni
Roman Catholic bishops of Leeds
English College, Rome alumni
English Roman Catholic bishops